The International Chiba Ekiden was an annual team road running competition held in Chiba, Japan in late November. The marathon relay race, or ekiden as it is known in Japan, is one of the prominent annual races of its kind. The competition is split into six legs which combine to make up the marathon distance of 42.195 km. The Chiba Ekiden was first held in 1988 and featured separate competitions for both men and women. Since 2007, each competing country selects three men and three women for their team. The legs are divided as follows: 5 km (men), 5 km (women), 10 km (men), 5 km (women), 10 km (men), and 7.195 km (women).

The men's world record for the event was set at the competition in 2005 as the Kenyan team of Josephat Ndambiri, Martin Mathathi, Daniel Mwangi, Mekubo Mogusu, Onesmus Nyerere and John Kariuki completed the course in a time of 1:57:06. In the same race the Japanese team ran an Asian record, the United States men ran a North American record and the fourth-placed Russian team broke the European record.

Winners
Key: Stage winner

See also
Chiba International Cross Country, another prominent athletics competition in the city

References

External links
Official site

Race commentaries in English: 2007, 2008, 2009, 2010 2011.



Recurring sporting events established in 1988
2014 disestablishments in Japan
Road running competitions in Japan
Ekiden
Sport in Chiba (city)
Autumn events in Japan